The House of Colleoni was a Guelf-allied noble family in medieval Bergamo. Their Ghibelline opponents were the Suardi family, of which the Colleoni themselves were a branch.

History 
When the Visconti of Milan seized Bergamo, they exiled the Colleoni and other Guelfs. On October 23, 1404, Paolo Colleoni seized Trezzo Castle by wile and held it by force until he was assassinated by his cousins, probably acting on behalf of the Duke of Milan. Paolo's son Bartolomeo became a famous mercenary and Captain-General of the Republic of Venice. He purchased and refurbished the Malpaga Castle in Cavernago as a new base for his family. The Colleoni Chapel in Bergamo was built in his honor and houses his remains and those of his beloved daughter Medea.

Bartolomeo's grandson Count Alessandro Martinengo Colleoni commissioned Lorenzo Lotto's 1516 Martinengo Altarpiece for the Dominican church of Santi Bartolomei e Stefano in Bergamo.

The family's name is derived from the Latin coleus, or testicle, and indeed, the family's coat of arms was two pairs of white testicles on a red field, above one red pair on a white field. The progenitor of the family, Gisalberto, was reportedly proud of this coat of arms which he displayed prominently on his properties. Later members of the family modified the testicles on the coat of arms into upside-down hearts.

See also
 A Gun For Sale, a 1936 Graham Greene novel which names its mafia family after the Colleoni

References 

Wars of the Guelphs and Ghibellines